Zoya is a 1987 romance novel by American Danielle Steel. It is Steel's 23rd novel.

Plot
Zoya Konstantinovna Ossupov is a Russian countess, a young cousin to Tsar Nicholas II. Escaping the Russian Revolution with her grandmother and a loyal retainer, she arrives in Paris, penniless, where she must carve a new life for herself and her loved ones. There, she joins Diaghilev's Ballets Russes. Against the wishes of her grandmother, who objects to consorting with those outside her class, she meets and falls in love with American GI Clayton Andrews. After World War I, they marry and move to America, where Zoya faces many joys and hardships in her life. She struggles through the Great Depression and World War II, then meets and falls for millionaire cloth merchant, Simon Hirsch, who later died in another war.

Film adaptation
In the TV movie version, Zoya is portrayed by Melissa Gilbert. Her husband, Clayton Andrews, is portrayed by her real life former husband Bruce Boxleitner. Zoya's grandmother Evgenia is portrayed by Dame Diana Rigg.

References

1988 American novels
Historical romance novels
Novels by Danielle Steel
American novels adapted into films
Novels set in the Russian Revolution
American novels adapted into television shows
American historical novels
Delacorte Press books
American romance novels